Arenibacter hampyeongensis is a Gram-negative, strictly aerobic bacterium from the genus Arenibacter which has been isolated from tidal flat from Hampyeong in Korea.

References

External links
Type strain of Arenibacter hampyeongensis at BacDive -  the Bacterial Diversity Metadatabase

Flavobacteria
Bacteria described in 2013